The following lists events that happened during 1926 in New Zealand.

Population
The 1926 New Zealand census is held on 20 April.

Incumbents

Regal and viceregal
 Head of State – George V
 Governor-General – Sir Charles Fergusson

Government
The 22nd New Zealand Parliament continues with the Reform Party governing.

Speaker of the House – Charles Statham
Prime Minister – Gordon Coates
Minister of Finance – William Nosworthy until 24 May, then William Downie Stewart
Minister of External Affairs – Francis Bell until 18 January, then from 24 May William Nosworthy

Parliamentary opposition
Leader of the Opposition – vacant until 26 June, then Harry Holland (Labour Party)

Judiciary
 Chief Justice – Sir Robert Stout, then Charles Skerrett from 1 February

Main centre leaders
Mayor of Auckland – George Baildon
Mayor of Wellington – Charles Norwood
Mayor of Christchurch – John Archer
Mayor of Dunedin – Harold  Tapley

Events 
 15 April – The Eden by-election is won by Rex Mason (Labour). As a result, Labour became the dominant party in opposition, with 12 seats compared to the Liberals' 11.
 15 November – The Balfour Declaration asserts the right of New Zealand and other dominions to exist as independent countries
 3 December – Nine miners die in an explosion in the Dobson coal mine near Brunner
 Undated
 Writer and adventurer Zane Grey first visits New Zealand, helping to popularise big-game fishing
 Department of Scientific and Industrial Research is established
 Pavlova reportedly created by a Wellington hotel chef in honour of the visit of Anna Pavlova
 Ash eruption of Red Crater, Mount Tongariro
 Leonard Cockayne publishes the first part of Monograph on New Zealand beech forests, which argues that the forests could be managed with a rotation of 80–120 years, but warns about overgrazing by deer

Arts and literature

See 1926 in art, 1926 in literature, :Category:1926 books

Music

See: 1926 in music

Radio

See: Public broadcasting in New Zealand

Film

See: 1926 in film, List of New Zealand feature films, Cinema of New Zealand, :Category:1926 films

Sport

Chess
 The 35th National Chess Championship is held in Dunedin, and is won by S. Crakanthorp of Sydney, his second title

Cricket
 New Zealand, along with India and the West Indies, is admitted to the Imperial Cricket Conference, increasing the number of test playing nations to six

Football
 The Chatham Cup is won by Sunnyside (Christchurch)
 Provincial league champions:
	Auckland – Tramways
	Canterbury – Sunnyside
	Hawke's Bay – Whakatu
	Nelson – Athletic
	Otago – HSOB
	South Canterbury – Colmoco
	Southland – Ohai
	Taranaki – Auroa
	Waikato – Huntly Thistle
	Wanganui – Woollen Mills
	Wellington – Hospital

Golf
 The 16th New Zealand Open championship is won by Andrew Shaw after a playoff with Ernie Moss.
 The 8th National Amateur Championships are held at Miramar (men) and Balmacewan (women)
 Men – Arthur Duncan (Wellington) (his tenth title)
 Women – Louisa Kerr (Timaru)

Horse racing

Harness racing
 New Zealand Trotting Cup – Ahuriri (2nd win)
 Auckland Trotting Cup – Talaro

Thoroughbred racing
 New Zealand Cup – Count Cavour
 Avondale Gold Cup – Beacon Light
 Auckland Cup – Tanadees
 Wellington Cup – Enthusiasm
 New Zealand Derby – Commendation

Lawn bowls
The national outdoor lawn bowls championships are held in Dunedin.
 Men's singles champion – W. Foster (Caledonian Bowling Club)
 Men's pair champions – W. R. Todd, E. Tamlyn (skip) (St Kilda Bowling Club)
 Men's fours champions – J. D. Best, H. G. Siedeberg, F. McCullough, E. Harraway (skip) (Dunedin Bowling Club)

Rugby league
 The New Zealand national rugby league team tours Britain, losing all three tests against Great Britain and one test against Wales
 The NZRFU takes legal action to prevent the NZRL from using the name "All Blacks" for the national rugby league team

Rugby union
 1926 New Zealand rugby union tour of New South Wales 
 1926–27 New Zealand Māori rugby union tour
 Ranfurly Shield – held by Hawkes Bay for the full season

Births

January
 3 January
 Marie Clay, literacy researcher
 David Spence, mathematician
 6 January – Pat Vincent, rugby union player, coach and administrator
 10 January – Jim Eyles, archaeologist
 11 January – Mary Rouse, cricketer
 19 January – Peter Cape, musician
 20 January – Tui Uru, broadcaster, singer
 29 January – Dennis McEldowney, writer, publisher

February
 3 February – Guy Ngan, artist
 7 February – Graham Latimer, Māori leader
 13 February – Lloyd Berrell, actor
 14 February – Sheila Natusch, naturalist, writer, illustrator
 20 February – Ted Meuli, cricketer
 26 February – Edwin Norton, weightlifter

March
 5 March – Joan Mattingley, clinical chemist
 13 March – June Litman, journalist
 19 March – Noel Bowden, rugby union player
 22 March – Helen Young, radio manager, arts advocate
 24 March
 Betty Clegg, watercolour artist
 Rowena Jackson, ballet dancer
 27 March – Harry Tapping, cricketer

April
 2 April – Maurie Gordon, sport shooter
 6 April – Don Bacon, microbiologist
 11 April – Vivienne Boyd, community leader
 12 April – Hoani Waititi, Māori community leader
 14 April – Barbara Anderson, writer
 18 April – Peter Henderson, rugby union and rugby league player, sprinter
 22 April – Arthur Eustace, track and field athlete, coach and administrator

May
 6 May – Colin Webster-Watson, sculptor, poet
 9 May – Robin Cooke, jurist
 15 May – Lyall Barry, swimmer, schoolteacher, local historian
 19 May – Nancy Adams, botanist, botanical artist, museum curator
 23 May – John Hollywood, cricketer
 27 May – Gordon Leggat, cricket player and administrator

June
 7 June – John Kennedy, Roman Catholic journalist
 11 June – Louise Sutherland, cyclist
 17 June – Don Rowlands, rower, rowing administrator, businessman
 18 June – Joe Walding, politician, diplomat
 19 June
 Rod Coleman, motorcycle racer
 Barrie Hutchinson, water polo player, rugby union player and administrator, politician
 23 June – Jim Barnden, boxer
 24 June – Graham Liggins, medical scientist
 25 June – June Schoch, athlete
 29 June – James K. Baxter, poet

July
 5 July – Trevor Davey, politician
 14 July – Patricia Woodroffe, fencer
 18 July – Bernard Diederich, writer, journalist, historian
 22 July – Ron Russell, politician
 23 July – Tom O'Donnell, medical practitioner and academic
 31 July – Don Donnithorne, architect

August
 10 August – Edwin Carr, composer
 17 August – Solomon Faine, microbiologist

September
 10 September – Jack Somerville, lawn bowls player
 11 September – Joe Schneider, rower
 17 September – William Lunn, rugby union player
 22 September – Denzil Meuli, writer, newspaper editor, Roman Catholic priest
 29 September – Vivienne Cassie Cooper, planktologist, botanist

October
 4 October – Phar Lap, Thoroughbred racehorse
 13 October
 George Gair, politician, diplomat
 Bill James, rower
 16 October – Peter Arnold, cricket player and administrator
 26 October – John Myles, athlete
 28 October
 Doug Anderson, rugby league player
 Merv Norrish, diplomat, public servant
 30 October – Nan Kinross, nurse and nursing academic
 31 October – Stanley Dallas, recording engineer, radio technician

November
 3 November – Edward Gaines, Roman Catholic bishop
 7 November – Graeme Allwright, singer-songwriter
 20 November – Tom Newnham, political activist

December
 1 December – Barry Dallas, politician
 5 December – Derek Turnbull, athlete
 7 December – Jack Kelly, rugby union player, schoolteacher
 12 December
 Maida Bryant, politician, community leader
 Laurie Davidson, yacht designer
 13 December – Dave Batten, athlete
 14 December – Alan Rowe, actor
 15 December – Ron Bailey, politician
 18 December – Jock Aird, association footballer
 20 December – John Holland, athlete
 21 December – Alan Hellaby, businessman
 23 December – Peter Iles, cricketer
 24 December – Jimmy Edwards, rugby league player
 25 December – Colin Chambers, swimmer
 30 December – Richard Farrell, pianist
 31 December – Pauline Yearbury, artist

Exact date unknown
 Friedrich Eisenhofer, architect
 George Johnson, artist
 Maurice K. Smith, architect, architectural academic

Deaths

January–March
 19 January – Helen Stace, school matron (born 1850)
 8 February – John Graham, politician (born 1843)
 14 February – Ellen Hewett, writer (born 1843)
 27 February – James Palmer Campbell, politician (born 1855)
 1 March – John Barton Roy, politician (born 1854)
 13 March – Mere Rikiriki, Māori prophet (born 1855)
 15 March – Charles Blomfield, artist (born 1848)
 22 March – Louisa Baker, journalist, novelist (born 1856)

April–June
 14 April – Hans Madsen Ries, Lutheran pastor, politician (born 1860)
 17 April – Andrew Graham, politician (born 1843)
 26 April – Bobby Leach, thrillseeker (born 1858)
 1 May
 William John Geddis, politician (born 1860)
 Isabella May, temperance worker, suffragist, dress reformer (born 1850)
 24 May – William Morley, Methodist minister, historian (born 1842)
 28 May – Frederick Liggins, cricketer (born 1873)
 5 June – Elizabeth Gard'ner, home science teacher and administrator, writer (born 1858)
 8 June – David Goldie, politician, mayor of Auckland (1898–1901) (born 1842)
 13 June – Gottfried Lindauer, painter (born 1839)
 15 June – William Belcher, trade union leader (born 1860)
 24 June – G. P. Nerli, painter (born 1860)

July–September
 18 July – Archibald Cargill, cricketer (born 1853)
 1 August – Sophia Anstice, dressmaker, draper, businesswoman (born 1849)
 13 August – Te Mete Raukawa, Ngāti Ranginui leader, assessor (born 1836)
 18 August – Grace Neill, nurse, social reformer (born 1846)
 3 September – John McCombie, gold prospector, mine manager (born 1849)
 8 September – Hugh Lusk, politician (born 1837)

October–December
 1 October – Suzanne Aubert (Sister Mary Joseph), missionary nun (born 1835)
 9 October – Sir Arthur Myers, politician, mayor of Auckland (1905–09) (born 1868)
 18 October – Sir James Carroll, politician (born 1857)
 26 October – Frederick Pirani, politician (born 1858)
 7 November – Henry Baker, cricketer (born 1904)
 7 December – Charles Purnell, journalist, newspaper editor, writer (born 1843)
 12 December – Jane Preshaw, nurse, midwife, hospital matron (born 1839)
 22 December – Mina Arndt, painter (born 1885)
 23 December – Joseph Frear, builder (born 1846)
 28 December – Robert William Felkin, medical missionary, explorer, ceremonial magician (born 1853)

See also
List of years in New Zealand
Timeline of New Zealand history
History of New Zealand
Military history of New Zealand
Timeline of the New Zealand environment
Timeline of New Zealand's links with Antarctica

References

External links

 
Years of the 20th century in New Zealand